The Cricamola River is a river of Panama. It drains into the southeast shore of Chiriquí Lagoon.

See also
List of rivers of Panama

References

Rivers of Panama